Pallurikio is an action platform game developed and published by Italian game developer Playstos Entertainment. It was released on WiiWare on December 11, 2009, and on PlayStation Store on July 14, 2010.

Gameplay

Characters

There is only one main character, which is Pallurikio, a red bouncing ball controlled by the gamer.

Controls and movement

Pallurikio can only jump or roll, and these movements are directed using a cursor (moved with the Wii remote or the analog stick of the PS system) and calibrated holding a button to give power to the jump.

Synopsis

Plot
Rusty, playing with his friends a mysterious board game, is brought into a parallel dimension and becomes a bouncing ball named Pallurikio. He will try to escape and return to his world after clearing all the stages of the game.

Stages
The game includes 50 stages, and each of them has unique features regarding:

  obstacles that can kill the ball if touched, they can be still or moving objects;
  terrain characteristics, for example unstable places or breakable ones.

References

External links
 Playstos Entertainment website

WiiWare games
PlayStation 3 games
PlayStation Network games
PlayStation Portable games
PlayStation Vita games
Video games developed in Italy
2009 video games
Platform games